Athyana is a monospecific genus of plant in the family Sapindaceae, containing only Athyana weinmannifolia. It is found in Argentina and Bolivia. It is threatened by habitat loss.

References

Vulnerable plants
Sapindaceae
Monotypic Sapindaceae genera
Flora of Argentina
Flora of Bolivia
Taxonomy articles created by Polbot
Taxobox binomials not recognized by IUCN